Steve Ellner (born December 21, 1946) is an American scholar who has taught economic history and political science at the Universidad de Oriente (UDO), Venezuela, since 1977. He is the author of numerous books and journal articles on Venezuelan history, political parties, and organized labor. Ellner has written op-ed articles for the New York Times and the Los Angeles Times. Many of his academic works have been translated and published in Spanish.

Since January 2019, he is also an Associate Managing Editor of the journal Latin American Perspectives.

Early life and education 
Ellner was born in New York City where his paternal grandfather and grandmother arrived from Austria and Finland respectively. His grandfather, Joseph Ellner, was a writer and editor of The Gipsy Patteran. In 1954, Ellner’s family moved to Connecticut.

Ellner received his BA at Goddard College in Vermont, his MA at Southern Connecticut State University and his PhD at the University of New Mexico, where his advisor was the prominent historian Edwin Lieuwen. All his degrees are in Latin American history. In the 1960s, Ellner participated in Students for a Democratic Society (SDS) and later the American Independent Movement (AIM) in New Haven, Connecticut and the United Farm Workers boycott committee in Albuquerque, New Mexico.

Ellner is married to Carmen Hercilia Sánchez and has two children.

Academic career 
In addition to being a full-time professor at the UDO, Ellner has been a visiting professor at the Central University of Venezuela (1994-2001), St. John Fisher College in Rochester, NY (2001), Georgetown University (2004), Duke University (2005), Universidad de Buenos Aires (2010), the Australian National University (2013) and Tulane University (2015), and has taught at the School of International and Public Affairs of Columbia University (2011) and Johns Hopkins University (2012). Ellner is on the advisory board of Science and Society.

Awards and honors 
“University Academic Productivity Prize” in the area of social sciences (first place), granted by the university research commissions (CDCHT) of the National Council of Universities in Venezuela, 2004.

Books 
	Los partidos políticos y su disputa por el control del movimiento sindical en Venezuela, 1936-1948 (Universidad Católica Andrés Bello, 1980).
	The Venezuelan Petroleum Corporation and the Debate over Government Policy in Basic Industry (University of Glasgow, 1987).
	Venezuela's Movimiento al Socialismo: From Guerrilla Defeat to Electoral Politics (Duke University, 1988).   
	Generational Identification and Political Fragmentation in Venezuelan Politics in the Late 1960s (University of Akron-Allegheny, 1989).
	Organized Labor in Venezuela, 1958-1991: Behavior and Concerns in a Democratic Setting (Scholarly Resources, 1993). 
	The Latin American Left: From the Fall of Allende to Perestroika, co-editor with Barry Carr (Westview, 1993).  
	Venezuelan Politics in the Chávez Era: Class, Polarization and Conflict, co-editor with Daniel Hellinger (Lynne Rienner, 2003). 
	Neoliberalismo y Anti-Neoliberalismo en América Latina: El debate sobre estrategias. (Editorial Tropykos, 2006). 
	Venezuela: Hugo Chávez and the Decline of an “Exceptional” Democracy,” co-editor with Miguel Tinker Salas (Rowman and Littlefield, 2007). 
	Rethinking Venezuelan Politics: Class, Conflict and the Chávez Phenomenon (Lynne Rienner, 2008).  
	El fenomeno Chávez: sus orígenes y su impacto (Editorial Tropykos, 2011). . Second edition: CELARG, 2014. 
	Latin America’s Radical Left: Challenges and Complexities of Political Power in the Twenty-First Century, editor (Rowman & Littlefield, 2014). 
  Latin America’s Pink Tide: Breakthroughs and Shortcomings, editor (Rowman & Littlefield, 2020).

References 

Economists from New York (state)
Political science educators
Labor economists
Latin American history
1946 births
Living people
21st-century American economists